Finney is a six-part British television crime drama series, written and created by David Kane and directed by David Hayman, that first broadcast on ITV on 17 November 1994. A television spin-off from the 1988 film Stormy Monday, Finney stars David Morrissey in the title role, taking over from Sting. The series was produced by Zenith Entertainment in association with Tyne Tees Television. The series was produced by Nigel Stafford-Clark, who also acted as producer on Stormy Monday.

Finney co-starred Christopher Fairbank, Lynn Farleigh, Melanie Hill, Pooky Quesnel, Clive Russell, Andy Serkis and John Woodvine in supporting roles, and follows the struggle for power between two rival crime families - the Finneys and the Simpsons. The series received critical acclaim, including The Times, who commented "It's the real thing. The acting is terrific." and the Daily Star, who called the series "addictive viewing" and commented that it was "nail-bitingly good." The complete series was released on Region 1 DVD in the United States on 28 August 2007; but remains unreleased on Region 2.

Reception
Allison Pearson of The Independent reviewed the first episode of the series, writing, "Finney... is an everyday story of disorganised crime in which the Corleone family has quit Long Island for Whitley Bay, changed its name to Tucker and been issued with Geordie accents that deliver lines of untold menace... With its designer violence, Finney is just what the network director ordered. Its main problem is perennial and insoluble: British villains are just not up to speed."

Cast
 David Morrissey as Stephen Finney
 Christopher Fairbank as Bobo Simpson Jr.
 Lynn Farleigh as Mary
 Melanie Hill as Lena Finney
 Pooky Quesnel as Carol Finney
 Clive Russell as Tucker Finney
 Andy Serkis as Tom Finney
 John Woodvine as Bobo Simpson Snr.
 Michael Yeaman as Jimmy Spears
 David Hayman as McDade 
 Brian Lewis as PawPaw 
 Angela Lonsdale as Suzie Finney
 Mark Benton as Billy 
 Jonathan Magnanti as Iain 
 John McArdle as Louis Souter

Episodes

References

External links

1994 British television series debuts
1994 British television series endings
1990s British crime television series
1990s British drama television series
ITV television dramas
1990s British television miniseries
Television shows produced by Tyne Tees Television
Television series by ITV Studios
English-language television shows
Television shows set in Newcastle upon Tyne
Television shows set in Northumberland